Federalist No. 50 is the fiftieth essay of The Federalist Papers. The authorship of the work is disputed between James Madison and Alexander Hamilton. It was published on February 5, 1788, under the pseudonym Publius, the name under which all The Federalist papers were published. It is titled "Periodic Appeals to the People Considered".

Summary 
Federalist No. 50 further examines the proper means of "PREVENTING AND CORRECTING INFRACTIONS OF THE CONSTITUTION." Whereas No. 49 refutes arguments for occasional appeals of the people, No. 50 argues against a second alternative: periodic appeals of the people, occurring with a higher frequency. With this latter system, the author claims, the judgement of people to remedy infringements on the constitution would be clouded by a passion and zeal rooted in its recency, ultimately leading to a failure to reach a solution. The author propounds an example from the Pennsylvania legislative where legislators acting as intermediaries to enforce checks and balances were biased and thus ineffective.

External links 

 Text of The Federalist No. 50: congress.gov

1788 in American law
50
1788 essays
1788 in the United States
Works of uncertain authorship